Atya lanipes (Spanish common name: gata) is a freshwater amphidromous shrimp of the Atyidae family in the Decapoda order. It is found widely in the Caribbean  and is common in the Toro Negro State Forest in central Puerto Rico. It is also known as jonga and in some places people refer to it as "guábara” or “chágara”.

See also
 La muñeca menor

References

Atyidae
Crustaceans described in 1963
Crustaceans of Puerto Rico
Arthropods of the Dominican Republic